Ömer Aşık (born August 7, 1991) is a Turkish Paralympian archer competing in the Men's compound bow W1 event.

Early life
Ömer Aşık was born on August 7, 1991. He lives in Bolu, Turkey.

Sporting career
Aşık began his archery career in 2013, and debuted internationally in 2015. He has been coached by Ahmet Soner Mersinli at Bolu Polissporgücü Club since 2012.

He obtained a quota for the 2016 Summer Paralympics Games in Rio de Janeiro, Brazil.

References

1991 births
Sportspeople from Bolu
Turkish male archers
Paralympic archers of Turkey
Wheelchair category Paralympic competitors
Archers at the 2016 Summer Paralympics
Living people